Vaibhav Naik is a Shiv Sena politician from Sindhudurg district, Maharashtra. He is currently a member of the Legislative Assembly from Kudal Vidhan Sabha constituency of Konkan, Maharashtra, India as a member of Shiv Sena. He defeated then Industries Minister Narayan Rane in 2014 assembly polls by a margin of 10,376 votes.

Positions held
 2014: Elected to Maharashtra Legislative Assembly
 2019: Elected to Maharashtra Legislative Assembly

See also
 Ratnagiri–Sindhudurg Lok Sabha constituency

References

External links
  Shivsena Home Page 

Living people
People from Sindhudurg district
Maharashtra MLAs 2014–2019
Marathi politicians
Shiv Sena politicians
Year of birth missing (living people)